This is a list of political parties campaigning for self-government. Listed here are parties with a specific ethnic minority background or regional parties active on a national level promoting more autonomy or independence for their region. Only parliamentary (including regional parliaments or councils) or former parliamentary parties are listed. Some of these parties are members or observers of the European Free Alliance (EFA).

Belgium

See the Political parties in Belgium, since most parties are regionalist.

Canada

Quebec: See the List of political parties in Quebec, since most Quebec parties are regionalist.

Republic of China (Taiwan)
Taiwan Solidarity Union - seeks creation of a "Republic of Taiwan"

Democratic Progressive Party - seeks international recognition of the current de jure independence of "Republic of China, Taiwan" as stipulated in articles of the 1933 Montevideo Convention.

Denmark

Faroe Islands
See the List of political parties in the Faroe Islands, since most Faroese parties are regionalist.

Greenland
See the List of political parties in Greenland, since most Greenland parties are regionalist.

Finland

Swedish speaking: see the List of political parties in Åland, since all Åland parties are regionalist.

France

Alsace
Unser Land
Alsace d'abord

Basque Country
Basque Solidarity
Basque Nationalist Party
Abertzaleen Batasuna

Brittany
Breton Democratic Union
Breton Party
Emgann

Corsica
Party of the Corsican Nation
Corsican Nation

Martinique
Martinican Independence Movement
Martinican Progressive Party
Build the Martinique Country

Northern Catalonia
Catalan Unity

Occitania
Occitan Party

Savoy
Savoy Region Movement
Savoyan League

Germany

Bavaria
Bavaria Party

Lower Saxony
The Friesens

Lusatia
Lusatian Alliance

Schleswig-Holstein
South Schleswig Voter Federation

India
Telangana Rashtra Samithi (successful)
Jharkhand Mukti Morcha (successful)
Gorkha Janmukti Morcha

Iraq
Kurdistan Democratic Party of Iraq
Patriotic Union of Kurdistan

Italy

Alto Adige/South Tyrol
South Tyrolean People's Party
Die Freiheitlichen
South Tyrolean Freedom
Greens of South Tyrol
Citizens' Union for South Tyrol
Ladins Dolomites
Lega Nord Alto Adige – Südtirol
We South Tyroleans

Aosta Valley
Valdostan Union
Edelweiss
Autonomist Federation
Progressive Valdostan Union
Autonomy Liberty Participation Ecology
Lega Nord Valle d'Aosta

Apulia
Apulia First of All
Southern Action League
Moderates and Populars

Emilia-Romagna 
Lega Nord Emilia
Lega Nord Romagna

Friuli-Venezia Giulia
Lega Nord Friuli-Venezia Giulia
Slovene Union
Friuli Movement
Julian Front

Liguria
Lega Nord Liguria
Ligurian Independentist Movement

Lombardy
Lega Lombarda
Lega per l'Autonomia – Alleanza Lombarda

Marche
Lega Nord Marche

Northern and Central Italy
Lega Nord

Piedmont
Lega Nord Piemont
Lega Padana

Sardinia
Sardinia Nation
Sardinian Reformers
Fortza Paris
Sardinian Democratic Union
Sardinian Action Party
Independence Republic of Sardinia
Sardinia Tomorrow
Red Moors

Sicily
Party of the Sicilians
Movement for the Independence of Sicily
Reformist Democrats for Sicily
The Other South

Southern Italy
Great South
Movement for the Autonomies
Reality Italy–Autonomy South
Southern Action League
Lega Sud Ausonia

Trentino
Union for Trentino
Lega Nord Trentino
Trentino Tyrolean Autonomist Party
Administer Trentino
Ladin Autonomist Union
Trentino Civic List

Tuscany
Lega Nord Toscana
More Tuscany

Umbria
Lega Nord Umbria

Veneto
Liga Veneta
North East Union
North East Project
Liga Veneta Repubblica
Venetians Movement
Venetian Independence
Liga Veneto Autonomo
Toward North
Veneto State

Sweden
 Scanian Party

New Zealand
 New Munster Party
 NZ South Island Party
 South Island Party (2008)

Pakistan 
 Balochistan National Party (Awami)
 Balochistan National Party (Mengal)
 Awami National Party
 Pukhtunkhwa Milli Awami Party

Saint Kitts and Nevis

Nevis
Concerned Citizens Movement

Serbia

 League of Social Democrats of Vojvodina

Spain

Castile
Castilian Left (Izquierda Castellana)
Castilian Party (Partido Castellano)

Andalusia
Andalucista Party

Aragon
Aragonese Party (Partido Aragonés)
Aragonese Union (Chunta Aragonesista)

Asturias
Asturian Left (Izquierda Asturiana)
Andecha Astur

Balearic Islands
Socialist Party of Majorca
Proposal for the Isles (Proposta per les Illes)

Basque Country
Basque Nationalist Party (Partido Nacionalista Vasco)
Basque Solidarity (Eusko Alkartasuna)
Aralar
Communist Party of the Basque Homelands
EH Bildu

Canary Islands
Canarian Coalition
New Canaries

Catalonia
Convergence and Unity (Convergència i Unió), coalition of:
Democratic Convergence of Catalonia (Convergència Democràtica de Catalunya)
Democratic Union of Catalonia (Unió Democràtica de Catalunya)
Republican Left of Catalonia (Esquerra Republicana de Catalunya)
Initiative for Catalonia Greens (Iniciativa per Catalunya Verds), formerly in coalition with Izquierda Unida

Galicia
Galician Nationalist Bloc (Bloque Nacionalista Galego)

León
 Leonese People's Union (Unión del Pueblo Leonés)

Navarra
Navarrese People's Union (Unión del Pueblo Navarro)
Nafarroa Bai

Valencia
Compromise Coalition (Coalició Compromís)

Sri Lanka
 Tamil National Alliance

Sweden

Scania
Scania Party

Switzerland
Ticino League

Turkey
 Peace and Democracy Party
 Peoples' Democratic Party (Turkey)

United Kingdom

North of England
Northern Independence Party

Yorkshire
Yorkshire Party
Yorkshire Liberal Democrats

Cornwall
Mebyon Kernow – the Party for Cornwall

Wessex
Wessex Regionalist Party

England
English Democrats

Scotland
Scottish National Party
Scottish Greens

Wales
Plaid Cymru – the Party of Wales
Propel
Gwlad

Northern Ireland
All parties in the Northern Ireland Assembly support continued devolution for Northern Ireland. Irish nationalist/republican parties support a united Ireland.

United States

Alaska 
 Alaskan Independence Party

California 
 California National Party

Puerto Rico 
 Puerto Rican Independence Party

See also

 Lists of political parties
 Political parties of minorities
 List of active autonomist and secessionist movements

External links
 https://web.archive.org/web/20070709111610/http://www.broadleft.org/natliber.htm Comprehensive list of Leftist Movements for National, Ethnic Liberation or Regional Autonomy

self-government
Regionalist parties